Franklin Township, one of the eleven townships of Warren County, Ohio, United States, is in the northwest corner of the county.  It is the most populous township in the county: the 2000 census found 27,294 people there, down from 27,510 in 1990; of this total, 9,947 lived in the unincorporated portions of the township.

Geography

Located in the northwestern corner of the county, it borders the following townships and city:
German Township, Montgomery County - north
Clearcreek Township - east
Turtlecreek Township - south
Middletown - southwest
Madison Township, Butler County - west
Miami Township, Montgomery County - northwest

A large part of the township is in the cities of Franklin and Carlisle, but parts are in the city of Springboro.

Other communities in the township are Hunter, Blue Ball, and Chautauqua.

Name and history
Named from the village of Franklin, it is one of twenty-one Franklin Townships statewide.

One of the original four townships of Warren County, Franklin Township was created on May 10, 1803.

Government
The township is governed by a three-member board of trustees, who are elected in November of odd-numbered years to a four-year term beginning on the following January 1.  Two are elected in the year after the presidential election and one is elected in the year before it.  There is also an elected township fiscal officer, who serves a four-year term beginning on April 1 of the year after the election, which is held in November of the year before the presidential election.  Vacancies in the fiscal officership or on the board of trustees are filled by the remaining trustees.

In November 2004, the people of Franklin Township and the city of Franklin voted on a committee to study merging the two communities.  The Board of Elections improperly failed to submit the question to the voters in the township, but the vote in the city was against the merger.

Public services
Most of the township is in the Franklin City and Carlisle City School Districts, but parts are in the Springboro City and Middletown City School Districts.  Telephone service is provided through the Franklin, Middletown, Miamisburg, Centerville, and Germantown exchanges, while mail is provided through the Franklin, Carlisle, and Middletown post offices.

Interstate 75 runs through the township, as do State Routes 122, 123 and 73.  The Miami and Erie Canal formerly ran through the township.

Police protection in Franklin Twp. is provided by the Warren County Sheriff's Office.

References

External links
County website

Townships in Warren County, Ohio
1803 establishments in Ohio
Populated places established in 1803
Townships in Ohio